Lowndes County  is a county located in the south central portion of the U.S. state of Georgia. As of the 2020 census the population was 118,251. The county seat is Valdosta. The county was created December 23, 1825.

Lowndes County is included in the Valdosta Metropolitan statistical area. It is located along the Florida border.

The county is a major commercial, educational, and manufacturing center of south Georgia with considerable forest products including pulpwood and naval stores, such as turpentine and rosin.  Part of Grand Bay, a  swamp, is located in Lowndes County.

History

Native Americans and the Spanish
The land that became Lowndes County had historically been inhabited by the Timucua. During most of the age of European colonization, the area of modern Lowndes County was part of the colony of Spanish Florida. From approximately 1625 to 1657, the Spanish Empire maintained a Catholic mission to the Timucua, dubbed Mission Santa Cruz de Cachipile, in the southern portion of Lowndes County near present-day Lake Park. In the centuries that followed, Timucua civilization collapsed due to slave raiding and disease.

The Creek Nation peoples moved into the area and, by the early 19th century, they were well established here. On December 15, 1818, European Americans organized what they called Irwin County, which had been settled by pushing out the Creek people. In the 1830s Georgia and the federal government completed Indian Removal of most of the Native Americans from what became the state.

Early county history
Lowndes County was established by an act passed by the Georgia legislature on December 23, 1825. It was formed out of the 8th, 9th, 10th, 11th, 12th, 15th, and 16th land districts of Irwin County, Georgia. The county was named for William Jones Lowndes (1782–1822), a prominent South Carolina lawyer and Congressman. His father Rawlins Lowndes had been a Revolutionary War leader and was elected as South Carolina Governor. The Coffee Road was an improved trail first cut by Georgia militia to supply federal troops in Florida during the Creek Wars. It was the first route through the area of Lowndes County and opened up the area to white settlers.

During the first few years after Lowndes County was organized, its courts met at the tavern owned by Sion Hall on the Coffee Road, near what is now Morven, Georgia in Brooks County, on the west side of the Little River. The first county seat was established at Franklinville (sometimes spelled Franklynville) by the Georgia General Assembly on December 16, 1828. Franklinville was located about 5.6 miles to the east of Hahira in the eastern half of land lot 50 in the 11th land district; it was named after statesman and Founding Father of the United States, Benjamin Franklin.

At the time of the 1830 federal census, Lowndes County had 1,072 white males, 1,044 white females, 156 male slaves, 179 female slaves, and 4 free people of color, for a total population of 2,455. The introduction of steam-powered ships on the Withlacoochee and Little rivers led to a shift in the population toward the rivers. In December 1833 the state legislature passed a law establishing a new county seat at a place to be called Lowndesville. The law called for a courthouse, a jail, and a town to be laid out within land lot 109 in the 12th land district. This land lot is near the present Timber Ridge Road in Lowndes County.

It is uncertain why the plans for Lowndesville were abandoned, but in December 1834, the state legislature authorized commissioners to select a suitable site for a courthouse so that the county seat could be moved away from Franklinville. In October 1836, another group of commissioners was advertising for contracting proposals for the construction of a brick courthouse at Troupville. By Summer 1837, Troupville and Franklinville were both serving as courthouse sites. This continued until at least 1838. In December 1837 Troupville was incorporated. Rumors of the coming of the Brunswick and Chattahoochee Railroad, the opening up of Florida, and the prosperity of the surrounding farmland led to the growth of Troupville and Lowndes County in general. In 1845, the remaining county-owned land at Franklinville was sold at the courthouse in Troupville.

The closest battle to Troupville between Native Americans and whites was at Brushy Creek on November 10, 1836, in modern Berrien County. Creek Nation people were passing through Lowndes County to join the Seminole in Florida. General Winfield Scott, commander of United States field forces in the area, intended to stop the Creek movement and did. Virtually no Native Americans were left in South Georgia.

In February 1850 Lowndes County lost land to the formation of Clinch County. At that time the eastern border of Lowndes County was defined as the Alapaha River.
By the time of the 1850 census, Lowndes County had a free white population of 5,339, a free colored population of 20, and a slave population of 2,355. Lowndes County lost additional territory with the establishment of Berrien and Colquitt counties on February 25, 1856.

Establishment of Valdosta
Many residents of Lowndes County were unhappy when the Atlantic and Gulf Railroad announced June 17, 1858 that they had selected a planned route that would bypass Troupville. On June 22 at 3:00 AM, the Lowndes County courthouse at Troupville was set aflame by William B. Crawford, who fled to South Carolina after being released on bond.

On August 9, a meeting convened in the academy building in Troupville at which it was decided to create from the area of Lowndes County to the west of the Withlacoochee River a new county to be called Brooks County. Brooks was established on December 11. On December 13, 1858, the Georgia General Assembly passed a bill establishing Echols County, Georgia.

In December 1859, the Lowndes County board of commissioners were instructed by an act of the Georgia legislature to purchase land for a new county seat; it was to be along the line of the Atlantic and Gulf Railroad and as close to the center of the county as possible. As part of the same act the Brooks-Lowndes County border was adjusted so that the east bank of the Little River formed the border.

Land belonging to William Wisenbaker was chosen as the site of the new county seat of Valdosta. The arrival of the railroad led to the downfall of Troupville and the rise of Valdosta as a center for the economy of south Georgia. The shifting county boundary lines led to population loss for Lowndes County. The 1860 census showed the county having 2,850 free whites, no free persons of color, and 2,399 slaves.

Civil War

No battles during the American Civil War were fought in Lowndes County. Several regular Confederate Army companies were raised from the population. Those included:
 Company I "Lowndes Volunteers", 12th Regiment Georgia Infantry.
 Company G, 26th Regiment Georgia Infantry. Also known as New Company G, 13th Regiment Infantry.
 Company D, "Berrien Minutemen", 29th Regiment Georgia Infantry.
 Company D, "Valdosta Guards", 50th Regiment Georgia Infantry.

State Guard units included:
 Company B, "Lowndes Mounted Infantry" 11th Regiment Cavalry, Georgia State Guards.

In addition, two Georgia Militia companies were partially raised from the population in early 1864 following the reorganization of the militia. Those included:
 Company I, 11th Regiment Georgia Militia (which was also partially raised from the population of Ware County, Georgia)
 Company I, 12th Regiment Georgia Militia (which was also partially raised from the populations of Mitchell County, Georgia and Talbot County, Georgia)

Lowndes County also had a home guard unit, but it was only called into action once in the fall of 1863. In that instant some soldiers' wives in Thomasville, Georgia were threatening to break into a Confederate Government Commissary to feed their starving children. In April 1864 a group of women rioted at Stockton, Georgia after a local store owner refused to take Confederate money in exchange for yarn. They took all the yarn in his store. At the same time, armed women stole a wagon load of bacon from a government warehouse. A mob of women also went on a rampage for similar reasons in Naylor, Georgia at about the same time.

In February 1864 members of  Company I "Woodson Guards", 32nd Regiment Georgia Infantry camped overnight in Valdosta at an area south of the railroad while on their way to Battle of Olustee in northern Florida. It was to be the closest fighting came to Valdosta during the Civil War. Valdosta became a home for many refugees fleeing into south Georgia due to Sherman's March to the Sea. Among those refugees was the family of Doc Holliday. Other refugees came by the railroad from Savannah and the Sea Islands.

Reconstruction
In the years right after the Civil War, members of Company "G", 103rd United States Colored Troops were stationed at Valdosta as part of the military occupation of the South during the Reconstruction era.

Several years after the Civil War, 112 African American men, women, and children moved from Lowndes County to Arthington, Liberia in 1871 and 1872. Some settled there permanently to make their home in a colony established for free American blacks; a small number returned to the United States. Their emigration was supported by the American Colonization Society, which had been working since the antebellum years to relocate free blacks to this new colony in West Africa. African Americans dominated the new colony (and future country) both socially and politically well into the 20th century before indigenous peoples, the majority within the borders of the country, came to power.

Prior to 1872, the southern border of Lowndes County and of Georgia was slightly farther south. The border when Lowndes County was created was along what was called McNeil's Line. A dispute over the border between the states of Florida and Georgia later developed (see Florida v. Georgia). In 1857, the governors of the two states appointed surveyors for a joint survey of the border. This led to the creation of the Orr and Whitney Line, which was agreed to by the United States Congress on April 9, 1872.

20th century to present
In 1899 the cotton mill town of Remerton was established.

In 1918, a white planter, Hampton Smith, was murdered in Brooks County. He was known to have mistreated his black workers. Sidney Johnson, one of his workers, was suspected in Smith's death. Mobs of whites hunted in Brooks and Lowndes counties for Johnson, rounding up and killing at least 11 other black men and one black woman and her unborn baby in what historian Meyers called "a lynching rampage." One man was killed in Lowndes County and the others in Brooks. Mary Turner, the married mother of two young children and eight months pregnant, was brutally murdered in Lowndes County, near Folsom Bridge on the Little River. The unborn child was then cut from her womb and its head crushed by a booted foot of one of the participants in the lynching. Her husband had been lynched the day before although neither had anything to do with the white planter's death. None of the lynching participants were prosecuted.

In 1920, Lowndes County lost some territory when Lanier County was established.

World War II
On September 15, 1941, Moody Air Force Base opened. it was part of the federal government's investment in military facilities in the South. The region received considerable Federal monies during World War II.

Courthouses

The county's former courthouse was built circa 1905 and is listed on the National Register of Historic Places; it was the county's seventh courthouse. The first courthouse was built in 1828 at Franklinville, the original county seat. In 1834 another courthouse was built at the new county seat of Troupville. It was replaced by a new courthouse in 1842. The 1842 structure was destroyed by a fire set by William B. Crawford in June 1858.

The first courthouse at Valdosta was built in 1860 and was a wooden structure that was sold for the funding of a new courthouse by 1869. The wooden building used for the courts of ordinary burned down in 1869. Lowndes County was without an official courthouse for a number of years. A two-story brick building was completed in 1874. In 1900, county commissioners decided that a larger structure was needed. In March 1904 the old courthouse was demolished and in 1905, the seventh courthouse was completed. This is the structure that is locally referred to in the 21st century as 'the old courthouse.' In August and September 2010, the county government moved to a new judicial complex.

The 1905 Lowndes County Courthouse is widely acknowledged as one of the most beautiful county courthouses in Georgia. It is used for meetings, public display, and other community attractions. Today it is used for many events, meetings, and political purposes.

Geography

The north-central (east of Hahira), west-central (bordered by a north–south line that bisects Valdosta), and southwestern portions (west of Dasher) of Lowndes County are located in the Withlacoochee River sub-basin of the Suwannee River basin. The northwestern corner of the county is located in the Little River sub-basin of the same Suwannee River basin. The eastern portion of Lowndes County is located in the Alapaha River sub-basin of the larger Suwannee River basin.

Adjacent counties
 Berrien County (north)
 Lanier County (northeast)
 Echols County (east)
 Hamilton County, Florida (southeast)
 Madison County, Florida (southwest)
 Brooks County (west)
 Cook County (northwest)

Major waterways
 Alapaha River
 Alapahoochee River
 Grand Bay Creek (known in the 1800s as Irwin's River and later as Irwin's Creek)
 Little River (Withlacoochee River)
 Withlacoochee River (Suwannee River)

Transportation

Major highways

  Interstate 75
  U.S. Route 41
  U.S. Route 41 Business
  U.S. Route 84
  U.S. Route 221
  State Route 7
  State Route 7 Alternate
  State Route 7 Business
  State Route 31
  State Route 38
  State Route 94
  State Route 122
  State Route 125
  State Route 133
  State Route 135
  State Route 376
  State Route 401 (unsigned designation for I-75)

Pedestrians and cycling

 Azalea City Trail
 VSU Walking Trail System

Railroads

Previous
 Atlantic Coast Line Railroad
 Atlantic and Gulf Railroad
 Atlantic, Valdosta and Western Railway
 Georgia Southern Railroad
 Georgia Southern and Florida Railway
 Plant System
 Savannah, Florida and Western Railway
 Valdosta, Moultrie and Western Railroad

Current
All of the railroads serving Lowndes County today are freight-only; the closest Amtrak passenger stops are at Folkston and Jesup, both about 100 miles away.
 CSX Transportation
 Georgia and Florida Railroad
 Norfolk Southern Railway
 Valdosta Railway

Demographics

2000 census
As of the census of 2000, there were 92,115 people, 32,654 households, and 22,237 families residing in the county. There were 36,551 housing units at an average density of 72 per square mile (28/km2). The racial makeup of the county was 62.00% White, 33.99% Black or African American, 0.37% Native American, 1.20% Asian, 0.05% Pacific Islander, 1.08% from other races, and 1.32% from two or more races.  2.66% of the population were Hispanic or Latino of any race.

There were 32,654 households, out of which 35.30% had children under the age of 18 living with them, 48.50% were married couples living together, 15.90% had a female householder with no husband present, and 31.90% were non-families. 24.20% of all households were made up of individuals, and 7.60% had someone living alone who was 65 years of age or older.  The average household size was 2.61 and the average family size was 3.14.

In the county, the population was spread out, with 26.20% under the age of 18, 15.10% from 18 to 24, 31.30% from 25 to 44, 18.50% from 45 to 64, and 9.00% who were 65 years of age or older.  The median age was 30 years. For every 100 females there were 98.90 males.  For every 100 females age 18 and over, there were 97.60 males.

The median income for a household in the county was $32,132, and the median income for a family was $41,580. Males had a median income of $28,411 versus $20,755 for females. The per capita income for the county was $16,683.  About 13.90% of families and 18.30% of the population were below the poverty line, including 22.80% of those under age 18 and 17.30% of those age 65 or over.

2010 census
As of the 2010 United States Census, there were 109,233 people, 39,747 households, and 26,191 families residing in the county. The racial makeup of the county was 58.1% white, 35.8% black or African American, 1.5% Asian, 0.4% American Indian, 0.1% Pacific islander, 2.0% from other races, and 2.1% from two or more races. Those of Hispanic or Latino origin made up 4.8% of the population. In terms of ancestry, 10.6% were Irish, 8.9% were English, 8.6% were German, and 8.1% were American.

Of the 39,747 households, 35.6% had children under the age of 18 living with them, 44.4% were married couples living together, 16.9% had a female householder with no husband present, 34.1% were non-families, and 24.5% of all households were made up of individuals. The average household size was 2.59 and the average family size was 3.10. The median age was 29.9 years.

The median income for a household in the county was $39,096 and the median income for a family was $48,296. Males had a median income of $36,744 versus $28,546 for females. The per capita income for the county was $20,041. About 15.3% of families and 21.6% of the population were below the poverty line, including 27.5% of those under age 18 and 14.1% of those age 65 or over.

2020 census

As of the 2020 United States Census, there were 118,251 people, 42,639 households, and 26,536 families residing in the county.

Recreation
 Grand Bay
 Wild Adventures

Communities

Cities
 Hahira
 Lake Park
 Remerton
 Valdosta (county seat)

Town
 Dasher

Census-designated place
 Bemiss
 Moody AFB

Unincorporated communities
 Blanton
 Clyattville
 Franklinville (historic)
 Indianola
 Kinderlou
 Mineola
 Olympia (historic)
 Ousley
 Naylor
 Troupville
 Twin Lakes

Politics

See also

 National Register of Historic Places listings in Lowndes County, Georgia
List of counties in Georgia

References

External links

 Lowndes County
 Lowndes County Schools
 Documents from Lowndes County at the Digital Library of Georgia

 
Georgia (U.S. state) counties
Valdosta metropolitan area counties
1825 establishments in Georgia (U.S. state)
Populated places established in 1825